Wiener Neustadt Island
(Ostrov Viner-Neyshtadt,
also Остров Винер-Нойштадт, Ostrov Viner-Noyshtadt)
is an island in Franz Josef Land, Russian Federation.

History
This island was named after Wiener Neustadt, a town located south of Vienna, by the Payer-Weyprecht Austro-Hungarian Arctic expedition.

Geography
Wiener Neustadt Island is part of the Zichy Land subgroup of the Franz Josef Archipelago. It is separated from Ziegler Island and Salisbury Island by the narrow Collinson Sound (Proliv Kollinsona).

Wiener Neustadt Island's area is 237 km² and it is almost completely glacierized. The highest point of this island, Peak Parnass, is 620 m, the highest in Franz Josef Land.

References 

Islands of Franz Josef Land
Wiener Neustadt